Formula One, abbreviated to F1, is the highest class of open-wheeled auto racing defined by the Fédération Internationale de l'Automobile (FIA), motorsport's world governing body. The "formula" in the name refers to a set of rules to which all participants and vehicles must conform. The results of each race are combined to determine two annual championships, one for drivers and one for constructors.

A red flag is shown when there has been a crash or the track conditions are poor enough to warrant the race being stopped. The flags are displayed by the marshals at various points around the circuit. A Global Positioning System (GPS) marshalling system was introduced in 2007. It involves a display of flag signals in the driver's cockpit, which alerts them to the crash. Following a red flag being shown, the exit of the pit lane is closed and cars must proceed to the pit lane slowly without overtaking, lining up at the pit exit. From 2005, a ten-minute warning is given before the race is resumed behind the safety car, which leads the field for a lap before it returns to the pit lane. Previously, the race was restarted in race order from the penultimate lap before the red flag was shown. If a race is unable to be resumed, "the results will be taken at the end of the penultimate lap before the lap during which the signal to suspend the race was given". If 75% of the race distance has not been completed and the race cannot be resumed, half points are awarded. Until , no points were supposed to be awarded if the race could not be restarted and less than two laps had been completed, but starting in  this rule was updated to "no points if two laps or less have been completed".

A total of 26 races were restarted on the first lap, while 13  were not restarted, 9 because of rain and 4 due to crashes involving drivers.

Red-flagged races

 The "Lap" column identifies the lap on which the race was stopped.
 The "R" column indicates whether or not the race was restarted:

Notes

References

External links
 Formula One official website
 FIA official website

Red-flagged races